Johnson is a ghost town in Kane County, in the U.S. state of Utah. It is located 12 miles east of the present-day city of Kanab, Utah.

History
Johnson was founded in 1871 by the four Johnson brothers: Joel, Joseph, Benjamin, and William, and named for them. A post office called Johnson was established in 1871, and remained in operation until 1937.

Notable people
Joel Hills Johnson (1802-1882) - inventor, Mormon pioneer, missionary, published poet and gospel hymn composer, politician, judge, one of the founders of the town of Johnson

References

Ghost towns in Utah